Lonicera dioica (limber honeysuckle, glaucous honeysuckle) is a vine in the honeysuckle family native to Canada and the eastern and central United States. Lonicera dioica comprises four variations:  var. Dasygyna, var. Dioica, var. Douglasii, and var. Orientalis.

References

dioica